Rudy Kugeler (born 11 August 1928) is a Luxembourgian fencer. He competed in the team épée event at the 1960 Summer Olympics.

References

External links
 

1928 births
Possibly living people
Luxembourgian male épée fencers
Olympic fencers of Luxembourg
Fencers at the 1960 Summer Olympics
People from Differdange